Ryazanov is a Russian male surname. Its feminine counterpart is Ryazanova. It may refer to:
 Alexander Ryazanov (born 1953), businessman and politician
 Aleksey Ryazanov (pilot) (1920–1992), Soviet WWII flying ace
 David Ryazanov (1870–1938), Marxist scholar
 Eldar Ryazanov (1927–2015), film director
 Mikhail Ryazanov (born 1986), Russian ice hockey player
 Pyotr Ryazanov (1899–1942), composer and teacher
 Vasili Ryazanov (born 1990), football player
 Yuri Ryazanov (1987–2009), gymnast
 Yuri Ryazanov (born 1970), businessman and Russian politician
 Raisa Ryazanova (born 1944), Russian actress

See also
4258 Ryazanov, an asteroid

Russian-language surnames